A ball head is a metal or plastic apparatus placed on top of a tripod that increases stability and provides faster, more accurate rotation of the camera for the photographer. They are lighter than traditional three-way pan-tilt tripod heads. With fewer parts and a much simpler mechanism, ball heads are usually preferred by more advanced photographers.  They are usually quite expensive  most professional-quality heads are more than US$200, although some heads are available for less than $100.

See also
 Tripod head

References 

Photography equipment